Seabo Gabanakgosi (born 19 June 1979) was a Botswanan footballer who played as a midfielder. He played for the Botswana national football team between 1998 and 2006.

External links

Association football midfielders
Botswana footballers
Botswana international footballers
1979 births
Living people
Township Rollers F.C. players
Uniao Flamengo Santos F.C. players